Fernando Maximiliano Díaz Seguel (born 27 December 1961) is a Chilean football manager and former player who played as a goalkeeper. He is the current manager of Coquimbo Unido.

Career

He is known for winning 2005 Apertura with Unión Española and for reaching the semifinals of the 2008 Apertura with Ñublense.

After two years without managing, in 2 August 2022 he joined Coquimbo Unido in the Chilean Primera División.

Honours

Manager
Unión Española
 Primera División de Chile: 2005 Apertura

References

External links
 Official website 
 Se Fue Nano Díaz at Univision 

1961 births
Living people
Footballers from Santiago
Chilean footballers
Club Deportivo Universidad Católica footballers
Deportes Colchagua footballers
Curicó Unido footballers
Deportes Iberia footballers
C.D. Antofagasta footballers
Deportes Ovalle footballers
Chilean Primera División players
Primera B de Chile players
Association football goalkeepers
Chilean football managers
L.D.U. Quito managers
Deportes Puerto Montt managers
Universidad de Concepción managers
Cobreloa managers
Unión Española managers
Cobresal managers
Deportes Antofagasta managers
Ñublense managers
C.D. Universidad Católica del Ecuador managers
Santiago Morning managers
C.S.D. Municipal managers
San Marcos de Arica managers
Coquimbo Unido managers
Chilean Primera División managers
Primera B de Chile managers
Chilean expatriate football managers
Chilean expatriate sportspeople in Ecuador
Chilean expatriate sportspeople in Guatemala
Expatriate football managers in Ecuador
Expatriate football managers in Guatemala